The 2009 IIHF World Championship took place in Switzerland from 24 April to 10 May. The games were played in the PostFinance Arena in Bern and Schluefweg in Kloten.

The PostFinance Arena in Bern was renovated and accommodates an attendance of 17,000. The Eishalle Schluefweg in Kloten was expanded for the 2008–09 season to a capacity of 9,000 people. Switzerland gained the right to host the World Championship for the 10th time.
"Live for the Action" by Swiss hard rock veterans Krokus was named the official anthem of the tournament.

Russia won the championship, winning all its matches and defeating Canada in the final 2–1. Ilya Kovalchuk was named the best forward and the most valuable player of the tournament. Over 17 million people watched the televised final around the world.

Participating teams

Group A
  (roster)
  (roster)
  (roster)
  (roster)

Group B
  (roster)
  (roster)
  (roster)
  (roster)

Group C
  (roster)
  (roster)
  (roster)
  (roster)

Group D
  (roster)
  (roster)
  (roster)
  (roster)

Venues

Preliminary round

Sixteen participating teams were placed in the following four groups. After playing a round-robin, the top three teams in each group advanced to the qualifying round. The last team in each group competed in the relegation round.

Groups A and D were played in Kloten, groups B and C in Bern.

Group A

All times are local (UTC+2).

Group B

All times are local (UTC+2).

Group C

All times are local (UTC+2).

Group D

All times are local (UTC+2).

Qualifying round

The top three teams in the standings of each group of the Preliminary Round advanced to the qualifying round, and were placed in two groups: teams from Groups A and D went to Group F, while teams from Groups B and C went to Group E.

Each team played three games in this round, one against each of the three teams from the other group paired with theirs. These three games, along with the two games already played against the other two advancing teams from the same group in the Preliminary Round, counted in the qualifying round standings.

The top four teams in both groups E and F advanced to the playoff round.

Group E

All times are local (UTC+2).

Group F

All times are local (UTC+2).

Relegation round

The bottom team in the standings from each group of the Preliminary Round played in the relegation round. Germany, as hosts of the 2010 tournament, were guaranteed to stay in the top division.
Denmark, the best ranked team in the group from the other three teams, stayed in the top division for 2010, while Austria and Hungary were relegated to the Division I tournament.

Group G

All times are local (UTC+2).

Playoff round

Bracket

Quarter-finals

Semi-finals

Bronze Medal Game

Gold Medal Game

Ranking and statistics

Tournament Awards

 Best players selected by the directorate:
 Best Goaltender:  Andrei Mezin
 Best Defenceman:  Shea Weber
 Best Forward:          Ilya Kovalchuk
 Most Valuable Player:  Ilya Kovalchuk
 Media All-Star Team:
 Goaltender:  Andrei Mezin
 Defence:  Kenny Jönsson,  Shea Weber
 Forward:  Ilya Kovalchuk,  Steven Stamkos,  Martin St. Louis

Final standings

The final standings of the tournament according to IIHF:

* Hosts of the 2010 WC, therefore exempt from relegation.

Scoring leaders

List shows the top skaters sorted by points, then goals. If the list exceeds 10 skaters because of a tie in points, all of the tied skaters are left out.
GP = Games played; G = Goals; A = Assists; Pts = Points; +/− = Plus/minus; PIM = Penalties in minutes; POS = PositionSource: IIHF.com

Leading goaltenders

Only the top five goaltenders, based on save percentage, who have played 40% of their team's minutes are included in this list.
TOI = Time on ice (minutes:seconds); SA = Shots against; GA = Goals against; GAA = Goals against average; Sv% = Save percentage; SO = ShutoutsSource: IIHF.com

IIHF Broadcasting rights

See also

 2009 World Junior Ice Hockey Championships
 2009 Women's World Ice Hockey Championships
 2009 IIHF World U18 Championships
 2009 IIHF Women's U18 World Championships

References

External links
 

 
IIHF World Championship
1
2009
World
World
April 2009 sports events in Europe
May 2009 sports events in Europe
21st century in Bern
Sports competitions in Bern
Kloten